Beaconsfield High School (commonly known as Becky High) is a girls' grammar school in Beaconsfield, Buckinghamshire. The school takes girls from the age of 12 through to the age of 18 (A-levels). In order to gain admission into Beaconsfield High School, students from Buckinghamshire primary schools are required to take the 11+ examination and score an average of 121/141 across at least one exam, although students who score in the region of 117 will be considered for 'appeal'. The school has approximately 1,100 pupils with around 180 in each year group. The school has around 60 classrooms and built a new 'sixth form area' in 2010 which provided around 12 new classrooms, a fully equipped computer room, a new canteen with a larger seating area and a new common room.

Academics
In September 1997, the Department for Education and Skills (DfES) awarded the school specialist school status as a Technology College. It has been awarded a second specialism as a Language College. The school converted to academy status in September 2014.

In the 2008 exam series, it achieved a 100% pass rate at GCSE with an average of 502 points per candidate, and a 100% pass rate at A2 with an average points score of 397 per candidate. As of the 2012 A-Level results, Beaconsfield High School managed to obtain the best A-level results in Buckinghamshire.

This school is also one of only 45 schools in the United Kingdom to be rated 'Exceptional' by Ofsted in 2019.

Facilities 

Beaconsfield High School has three netball courts which are converted into tennis courts in the summer, a 400m athletics track, a fitness gym and a sports hall which was opened in 2005 and can be used for sports including indoor hockey, indoor netball, badminton, volleyball, gym, trampolining and indoor athletics. There is a multisports astroturf used for hockey, football, tennis and rugby.

Head Teacher 
Penny Castagnoli became the head teacher in 1995 and retired from her post in August 2009. Owain Johns, deputy head and the head of design and technology department was the acting headteacher although the school made a decision to employ Sally Jarrett who was offered the role and then stepped down. From April 2012, Annette France was appointed as headteacher, she retired from her post in 2015. Rachel Smith was appointed headteacher in April 2015 till current date.

Alumni

 Simone Ashley, actress, known for playing Kate in Netflix's Bridgerton
 Serena Evans, actress, and daughter of actor Tenniel Evans, and married to actor Daniel Flynn
 Lindsey Fallow, presenter from 1999-2000 of Tomorrow's World
 Sara Geater FRSA, Head of Production, Drama and Film at Channel 4 from 1987–97, Chief Executive from 2010-14 of Talkback Thames, and Chief Operating Officer since 2015 of All3Media
 Lesley Hobley, hockey player in the England team in the 2006 Commonwealth Games
 Beth Rigby, journalist
 Clare Thomas, actress
 Amelia Thorpe, Managing Director from 1989-2002 of Ebury Press
 Jane Treays, documentary maker
 Jane Woodhead (nee Angus), Building Societies Ombudsman (Office of Building Societies Ombudsman) from 1991–93

References

External links
Department for Education Performance Tables 2011

Girls' schools in Buckinghamshire
Grammar schools in Buckinghamshire
Beaconsfield
Academies in Buckinghamshire
Specialist technology colleges in England
Specialist language colleges in England